Suho is a settlement in the Municipality of Dobje in eastern Slovenia. It lies immediately north of Dobje pri Planini. The area is part of the traditional region of Styria. It is now included with the rest of the municipality in the Savinja Statistical Region.

References

External links
Suho on Geopedia

Populated places in the Municipality of Dobje